Mătăsaru is a commune in Dâmbovița County, Muntenia, Romania with a population of 5,961 people. It is composed of seven villages: Crețulești, Mătăsaru, Odaia Turcului, Poroinica, Puțu cu Salcie, Sălcioara and Tețcoiu (the commune center).

References

Communes in Dâmbovița County
Localities in Muntenia